LH 4 or Laetoli Hominid 4 is the catalogue number of a fossilized mandible which was discovered by Mary Leakey in 1974 from Laetoli, Tanzania.

Mary Leakey and her team, Johanson and White, found between 1974 and 1977 forty-two hominid teeth associated with a jawbone. One of them was LH-4, a fine specimen with nine teeth. White described the fossils, and LH-4 was assigned as the "name-bearer" of the new species.

Observations 
The specimen is 2.9–3.9 million years old and is mandible of an adult Australopithecus afarensis with all molars present and a fairly large canine. Most anterior teeth and rami are missing. But, the dental arcade is in a good condition with little or no evidence of distortion.

References

Bibliography

External links 

1974 in paleontology
Australopithecus fossils
Prehistoric Tanzania
Fossils of Tanzania
Neogene fossil record